Jean Airport  is a public use government airport located one nautical mile (2 km) south of Jean, a town in Clark County, Nevada, United States. It is owned by the Clark County Commission and operated by the Clark County Department of Aviation. Also known as Jean Sport Aviation Center, it is mainly used for sports aviation like gliders and sky diving.

The National Plan of Integrated Airport Systems for 2011–2015 categorized it as a general aviation facility.

Facilities and aircraft
Jean Airport covers an area of 232 acres (94 ha) at an elevation of 2,832 feet (863 m) above mean sea level. It has two parallel runways with asphalt surfaces: 2L/20R is 4,600 by 75 feet (1,402 x 23 m) and 2R/20L is 3,700 by 60 feet (1,128 x 18 m).

For the 12-month period ending February 28, 2011, the airport had 20,000 general aviation aircraft operations, an average of 54 per day. At that time there were 34 aircraft based at this airport: 47% single-engine, 35% glider, 9% multi-engine, and 9% ultralight.

References

External links
  from Nevada DOT
 Aerial image as of June 1994 from USGS The National Map
 

Airports in Clark County, Nevada
Jean, Nevada